Trushnevo is a rural locality (a village) in Abakanovskoye Rural Settlement, Cherepovetsky District, Vologda Oblast, Russia. The population was 11 as of 2002.

Geography 
Trushnevo is located 33 km northwest of Cherepovets (the district's administrative centre) by road. Pogorelka is the nearest rural locality.

References 

Rural localities in Cherepovetsky District